Colvin Lake Provincial Park is a provincial park in Manitoba, Canada, designated by the Government of Manitoba in 2010. It is considered a Class Ib protected area under the International Union for Conservation of Nature (IUCN) protected-area management categories.

The park protects a wilderness area in the Selwyn Lake ecoregion, within the transition zone between the boreal forest and tundra known as the land of little sticks. Trees in this zone are stunted due to the presence of permafrost.

Wildlife and people use the elevated eskers as travel routes. Artifacts from pre-contact peoples have been found where the eskers are near water. The park protects range which is important to the Qamanirjuaq Barren Ground Caribou herds, habitat for wolverine, and summer breeding habitat for migratory birds.

The park's lakes drain northward into Nunavut through the Thlewiaza River. The park is within the traditional territories of the Northlands Denesuline First Nation who continue to have access to the park for traditional uses.

See also
List of protected areas of Manitoba
Nueltin Lake Provincial Park

References

External links
Protected Areas Initiative: Colvin Lake Provincial Park

Provincial parks of Manitoba
Protected areas of Manitoba